"Our Frank" is a song by Morrissey, released as a single in February 1991. It was the first single taken from the Kill Uncle album. It was also the first of his collaborations with Mark Nevin to be released.

The single reached number 26 in the UK Singles Chart. This was the lowest any Morrissey single had charted since his first release "Suedehead" in 1988. The accompanying video shows Morrissey surrounded by skinheads in a park: the video was not included on the 1992 The Malady Lingers On video compilation.

Despite its title, the song lyrics are not about a person named Frank, but rather they describe "frank and open, deep conversations" that get Morrissey nowhere and leave him disheartened. Throughout the song he complains about his frustration, asking his conversation partner to stop and uncharacteristically demanding cigarettes and alcohol to get through the dross. The final verse, however, sees Morrissey singing "Won't somebody stop me from thinking? From thinking all the time, about everything. So deeply, so bleakly..." indicating that the conversations he so dreads are in fact with himself. This introspective twist gives the song a hit of Morrissey's wry wit, but at the same time it displays the dark uniqueness that pervades the album. The lyrics of "Our Frank", along with the brooding music and strange production (Morrissey's voice is overdubbed and echoed) offer some insight into why the album was poorly received and also why some of the songs have become particularly popular with fans.

Critical reception
NME gave "Our Frank" a positive review, calling the single the singer's "freshest vinyl confection since 'Suedehead'". (That the review was genuinely positive is highly questionable, since it ended with the line "the B-Side is called Journalists Who Lie". However, Ned Raggett of AllMusic was less enthused, writing "the title track isn't all it could be."

Track listings

7" vinyl and cassette
 "Our Frank"
 "Journalists Who Lie"

12" vinyl
 "Our Frank"
 "Journalists Who Lie"
 "Tony the Pony"

CD
 "Our Frank"
 "Journalists Who Lie"
 "Tony the Pony"

Etchings on vinyl

British 7": FREE RON FREE REG/DRUNKER QUICKER

British 12": "FREE REG FREE RON"/"DRUNKER QUICKER"

Musicians
 Morrissey – vocals
 Mark E. Nevin – guitar
 Nawazish Ali Khan – violin
 Seamus Beaghen – piano
 Mark "Bedders" Bedford – bass guitar
 Andrew Paresi – drums

Live performances
The song was performed live by Morrissey on his 1991 Kill Uncle tour. Along with all of the material from Kill Uncle, "Our Frank" has never been performed by Morrissey since the 1991 tour, until July 1st, 2022 in Las Vegas when he also debuts 5 songs  .

Video

The promo video was filmed by John Maybury and featured footage of Morrissey miming to the song, intercut with scenes of skinheads running through the streets around London's Kings Cross. Morrissey was unhappy with the video and later misremembered the director's name in a 2006 interview in which he said, "I made a video years ago for the song "Our Frank" with the director James Maybury [sic] that was so awful that we tried to hide it."

References

Morrissey songs
1991 singles
Songs written by Morrissey
Songs written by Mark Nevin
1990 songs
Song recordings produced by Clive Langer
Song recordings produced by Alan Winstanley